Hollingbourne railway station serves Hollingbourne in Kent, England.

The station, and all trains serving it, is operated by Southeastern.

History
The goods yard was on the up side. It comprises five sidings, one of which served a goods shed and another served a cattle dock. Freight facilities were withdrawn on 15 May 1961. The signal box closed on 14 April 1984.

The station is unmanned; a self-service ticket machine is located on the up platform.

Services
All services at Hollingbourne are operated by Southeastern using  and  EMUs.

The typical off-peak service in trains per hour is:

 1 tph to  via  
 1 tph to 

During the peak hours, the station is served by an additional hourly service between London Victoria and Ashford International, increasing the service to 2 tph in each direction.

See also
 Hollingbourne Rural District
 Hollingbourne Downs
 Mills on Hollingbourne Stream

References 

Sources

External links

Borough of Maidstone
DfT Category F2 stations
Railway stations in Kent
Former London, Chatham and Dover Railway stations
Railway stations in Great Britain opened in 1884
Railway stations served by Southeastern
1884 establishments in England